Nicole Bradtke (née Provis) (born 22 September 1969) is a retired professional tennis player from Australia.

Bradtke won three singles and nine doubles titles on the WTA Tour. She reached the semifinals of the 1988 French Open, and won a bronze medal in doubles at the 1992 Summer Olympics, partnering Rachel McQuillan. In mixed doubles, she reached four Grand Slam finals, winning two of those partnering Mark Woodforde. Bradtke reached career-high rankings of No. 24 in singles and No. 11 in doubles. She retired from professional tennis in 1997 after a shoulder injury.

Professional career
The young Nicole Provis (Bradtke) started playing tennis at the age of seven.   Whilst still at school, she played her first professional tennis match in 1985, and made her debut at the Australian Open later that year. She found early success in mixed doubles, finishing runner-up at the 1987 Wimbledon Championships with Darren Cahill.

Bradtke burst into prominence in 1988, when she made the semifinals of the French Open as a relative unknown. She beat Sybille Niox-Château, Emmanuelle Derly before defeating two seeded players, Claudia Kohde-Kilsch and Sylvia Hanika, as well as Arantxa Sánchez Vicario (who had earlier beaten Chris Evert) before losing to Natasha Zvereva, despite holding two match points.

In early 1989, she reached the top 30, but failed to fulfill her early promise and quickly settled into the lower top 100 range, despite making further fourth rounds at the 1989 Australian Open and the 1990 French Open and winning her first title at home in Brisbane in 1992.

She then went on to great success in mixed doubles, winning both the 1992 Australian Open and the 1992 US Open with her partner, Mark Woodforde; and women's doubles, earning a bronze medal at the 1992 Summer Olympics in Barcelona.

She enjoyed a minor resurgence in singles in 1993, winning her second tour title in Kuala Lumpur and reaching the fourth round of the Australian Open. She also earned her biggest career victory during that year, beating world No. 1 Steffi Graf in a Fed Cup tie. Bradtke later helped Australia to reach the final, where they lost to the Spanish team.

After playing only eight events in 1994, she dropped out of the top 100, before recovering in 1995, earning another big victory over Gabriela Sabatini at the tournament in Berlin and returning to the top 40 in the world.

Bradtke retired after the 1997 Australian Open.

Personal life
She is married to Mark Bradtke, a former Australian professional basketball player, since 1994. Together they have two boys, Austin (born 2000) and Jensen (born 2004), and run an indoor sports centre in Melbourne. She previously served as a coach for the Australian Fed Cup team, as well as undertaking private coaching. She has worked with fellow Australians Samantha Stosur and Alicia Molik. In 2007, she joined the National High Performance Academy team.

Her sister Natasha is married to Todd Woodbridge, making him her brother-in-law.

Her eldest son Austin was selected by the Melbourne Football Club as a category B rookie and will join the club from 2019.

Grand Slam finals

Mixed doubles: 4 (2 titles, 2 runners-up)

WTA career finals

Singles (3–1)

Doubles (9–4)

ITF Circuit finals

Singles (4–0)

Doubles (0–1)

References

External links
 
 
 
 

1969 births
Living people
Australian female tennis players
Australian Open (tennis) champions
Hopman Cup competitors
Olympic bronze medalists for Australia
Olympic tennis players of Australia
Sportswomen from Victoria (Australia)
Tennis players at the 1992 Summer Olympics
Olympic medalists in tennis
Grand Slam (tennis) champions in mixed doubles
Grand Slam (tennis) champions in girls' doubles
Medalists at the 1992 Summer Olympics
Tennis players from Melbourne
Tennis players at the 1996 Summer Olympics
Australian Open (tennis) junior champions
20th-century Australian women
People educated at Mentone Girls' Grammar School